Collar De Esmeraldas (The Emerald Necklace) is an Argentine telenovela that aired in 2006. It starred Osvaldo Laport and Carina Zampini as protagonists.

Cast

Seasons 1–3

Seasons 1 & 2 only

Season 1 only

Seasons 2 & 3

Season 2 only

Season 3

Characters
Rivera Family
First Generation
Alfredo
Victor
Lidia
Second Generation
Martin
Antonio (Tony)
Franchini Family
First Generation
Luis
Second Generation
Romina (Romy)
Roberto (Roby)
Roxana (Roxy)
Ferrari Family
First Generation
Celia Agüero de Ferrari
Second Generation
Dardo
Third Generation
Eva (adopted)

First Generation
Atilio
Second generation
Tobias

Theme Song
The theme song for the novela, "Te tengo Que Encontrar" was written by Osvaldo Laport and Marcelo Wengrovsky.
It was performed by Osvaldo Laport.

Lyrics:
Yo quiero volar 
te tengo que encontrar 
y envuelta entre mis alas 
buscar la libertad.

Si sólo supieras, alma mía, 
que yo soy quien te busca, 
quien te sueña, 
quien te espera en cada despertar.

Te tengo que encontrar 
¡ para poderte amar!

Te tengo que encontrar...

Syndication
The series is broadcast on TV2, a Malaysian television station. It is aired at 11.00am on Mondays to Thursdays in the "Pearl" slot from November 16, 2009. It was initially scheduled to be aired in January 2009 but due to some circumstances, it was postponed. In 2010, the programme was moved to the 9:30 a.m. slot.

On January 13, 2010, TV2 selected this series to be aired on the slot "Morning Delight" at 4:30am. The series is now rescheduled to air at 1:00am from the previously odd-hour slot. This slot will re-run the series from its originating pilot.

International Broadcast

References

External links

2006 telenovelas
Argentine telenovelas
2006 Argentine television series debuts
2006 Argentine television series endings
Spanish-language telenovelas
El Trece telenovelas